Chloe Ting (born 9 April 1986) is a fitness personality YouTuber based in Singapore. She is known for her workout programs on YouTube, particularly her "Two Week Shred Challenge" which went viral on TikTok and YouTube during the pandemic in 2020.

Personal life 
Chloe Ting was born in Brunei and moved to Melbourne, Victoria, Australia at age 16. She has a Bachelor of Commerce from Monash University and later obtained a Master of Philosophy from the same institution. Ting is also a NASM Certified Personal Trainer. In 2021, Ting  left Melbourne and moved to Singapore. Ting's video production partner and boyfriend is Adrian.

Career 
Prior to starting a YouTube channel, Ting worked as an actuarial analyst. She has published a thesis on financial markets and was a Presenter & Chairperson at the Australasian Finance & Banking Conference.

YouTube 
Ting began her self-titled YouTube channel in 2011 while she was still working in statistics. She started posting videos from March 2016, when she was 29 years old. Originally, her content discussed fashion and travel, but by 2017, her channel became entirely focused on fitness. Her August 2019 video, "Get Abs in Two Weeks", went viral after other bloggers and vloggers tried the workouts depicted therein. As of October 2020, that video has 220 million views.

During summer 2020 when many were in quarantine due to COVID-19, Ting's "Two Week Shred Challenge" rose to popularity on the video-sharing application TikTok. As of October 2021, Ting's YouTube channel has over 22 million subscribers. In December 2020, YouTube released their official report for top trending videos and creators in 2020, with Ting appearing in charts worldwide across the US, UK, Europe and Asia. Digital Journal determined that Ting was the most-influential at home workout content creator.

Awards 
Ting won a Streamy Award at the 2020 Streamy Awards for the Health and Wellness category. Ting was also a finalist in the Health & Wellness (Creative & Media) category at the 2020 Shorty Awards and a finalist in the category Best Online Entertainment at the 2020 AACTA Awards. Ting was nominated in the Health and Wellness category at the 2021 Streamy Awards.

References 

Singaporean YouTubers
Health and fitness YouTubers
Living people
YouTube channels launched in 2011
1986 births
Monash University alumni